Jordanów may refer to the following places:
Jordanów in Lesser Poland Voivodeship (south Poland)
Jordanów, Łódź Voivodeship (central Poland)
Jordanów, Masovian Voivodeship (east-central Poland)